"(Back to The) Heartbreak Kid" is a song written by Van Stephenson and Tim DuBois, and recorded by American country music group Restless Heart.  It was released in October 1985 as the third single from the album Restless Heart.  The song reached number 7 on the Billboard Hot Country Singles & Tracks chart.

Music video
A video for the song, depicting the band performing, was shot at Vasquez Rocks.

Other versions
The song previously appeared on Kathy Mattea's 1984 self-titled album, and was the B-side to her 1984 single "You've Got a Soft Place to Fall".

Chart performance

References

1986 singles
1984 songs
Restless Heart songs
Kathy Mattea songs
Songs written by Tim DuBois
Songs written by Van Stephenson
Song recordings produced by Scott Hendricks
RCA Records Nashville singles